Kruppel-like factor 7 (ubiquitous), also known as KLF7, is a protein which in humans is encoded by the KLF7 gene.

This protein is a member of the Kruppel-like family of transcription factors.

References

Further reading

External links 
 

Transcription factors